Avon-by-the-Sea (often called simply Avon; pronunciation:) is a borough in Monmouth County, in the U.S. state of New Jersey. As of the 2020 United States census, the borough's population was 1,933, an increase of 32 (+1.7%) from the 2010 census count of 1,901, which in turn reflected a decline of 343 (−15.3%) from the 2,244 counted in the 2000 census.

Avon-by-the-Sea was incorporated as a borough by an act of the New Jersey Legislature on March 23, 1900, from portions of Neptune City. The borough was named for Avon, England, or for the Avon Inn, a hotel constructed in 1883.

Geography
According to the United States Census Bureau, the borough had a total area of 0.54 square miles (1.40 km2), including 0.43 square miles (1.10 km2) of land and 0.12 square miles (0.30 km2) of water (21.30%).

The borough borders the Monmouth County communities of Belmar, Bradley Beach, Neptune City and Neptune Township.

Avon-by-the-Sea is located on the Atlantic Ocean and is surrounded by two other bodies of water; the south side of Avon is located on the Shark River and the north end of Avon rests on Sylvan Lake.

Demographics

2010 census

The Census Bureau's 2006–2010 American Community Survey showed that (in 2010 inflation-adjusted dollars) median household income was $83,333 (with a margin of error of +/− $10,008) and the median family income was $113,750 (+/− $18,599). Males had a median income of $56,635 (+/− $32,033) versus $58,300 (+/− $5,223) for females. The per capita income for the borough was $58,063 (+/− $6,550). About 1.1% of families and 3.8% of the population were below the poverty line, including none of those under age 18 and 2.1% of those age 65 or over.

2000 census
As of the 2000 United States census there were 2,244 people, 1,043 households, and 535 families residing in the borough. The population density was 5,262.9 people per square mile (2,014.9/km2). There were 1,387 housing units at an average density of 3,253.0 per square mile (1,245.4/km2). The racial makeup of the borough was 97.15% White, 0.53% African American, 0.45% Native American, 0.89% Asian, 0.62% from other races, and 0.36% from two or more races. Hispanic or Latino of any race were 2.41% of the population.

As of the 2000 Census, 36.5% of Avon-by-the-Sea residents were of Irish ancestry, the third-highest percentage of any municipality in the United States, and second-highest in New Jersey, among all places with more than 1,000 residents identifying their ancestry.

There were 1,043 households, out of which 18.6% had children under the age of 18 living with them, 42.8% were married couples living together, 6.4% had a female householder with no husband present, and 48.7% were non-families. 41.1% of all households were made up of individuals, and 18.5% had someone living alone who was 65 years of age or older. The average household size was 2.15 and the average family size was 3.04.

In the borough the population was spread out, with 18.4% under the age of 18, 4.8% from 18 to 24, 28.7% from 25 to 44, 25.8% from 45 to 64, and 22.3% who were 65 years of age or older. The median age was 44 years. For every 100 females, there were 93.4 males. For every 100 females age 18 and over, there were 87.4 males.

The median income for a household in the borough was $60,192, and the median income for a family was $80,605. Males had a median income of $53,125 versus $35,857 for females. The per capita income for the borough was $41,238. About 2.3% of families and 2.7% of the population were below the poverty line, including 3.0% of those under age 18 and 4.4% of those age 65 or over.

Government

Local government

Avon-by-the-Sea has governed under the Walsh Act since 1919. The borough is one of 30 municipalities (of the 564) statewide that use the commission form of government. The governing body is comprised of three commissioners who are elected at-large on a non-partisan basis as part of the November general election to serve four-year terms of office on a concurrent basis. At a reorganization meeting after each election, each commissioner is assigned a department to administer and oversee; one of the commissioners is chosen to serve as mayor.

, members of the Avon-by-the-Sea Board of Commissioners are 
Mayor Edward R. Bonanno (Commissioner of Public Affairs and Public Safety), 
John B. Magrini (Commissioner of Public Works, Parks and Public Property) and 
Robert Mahon (Commissioner of Revenue and Finance), all serving concurrent terms of office that end December 31, 2023.

Federal, state and county representation
Avon-by-the-Sea is located in the 4th Congressional district and is part of New Jersey's 30th state legislative district. Prior to the 2011 reapportionment following the 2010 Census, Avon-by-the-Sea had been in the 11th state legislative district.

 

Monmouth County is governed by a Board of County Commissioners comprised of five members who are elected at-large to serve three year terms of office on a staggered basis, with either one or two seats up for election each year as part of the November general election. At an annual reorganization meeting held in the beginning of January, the board selects one of its members to serve as Director and another as Deputy Director. , Monmouth County's Commissioners are
Commissioner Director Thomas A. Arnone (R, Neptune City, term as commissioner and as director ends December 31, 2022), 
Commissioner Deputy Director Susan M. Kiley (R, Hazlet Township, term as commissioner ends December 31, 2024; term as deputy commissioner director ends 2022),
Lillian G. Burry (R, Colts Neck Township, 2023),
Nick DiRocco (R, Wall Township, 2022), and 
Ross F. Licitra (R, Marlboro Township, 2023). 
Constitutional officers elected on a countywide basis are
County clerk Christine Giordano Hanlon (R, 2025; Ocean Township), 
Sheriff Shaun Golden (R, 2022; Howell Township) and 
Surrogate Rosemarie D. Peters (R, 2026; Middletown Township).

Politics
As of March 2011, there were a total of 1,465 registered voters in Avon-by-the-Sea, of which 379 (25.9%) were registered as Democrats, 415 (28.3%) were registered as Republicans and 670 (45.7%) were registered as Unaffiliated. There was one voter registered to another party.

In the 2012 presidential election, Republican Mitt Romney received 63.3% of the vote (662 cast), ahead of Democrat Barack Obama with 35.7% (373 votes), and other candidates with 1.1% (11 votes), among the 1,053 ballots cast by the borough's 1,530 registered voters (7 ballots were spoiled), for a turnout of 68.8%. In the 2008 presidential election, Republican John McCain received 57.2% of the vote (680 cast), ahead of Democrat Barack Obama with 40.4% (480 votes) and other candidates with 0.8% (9 votes), among the 1,189 ballots cast by the borough's 1,520 registered voters, for a turnout of 78.2%. In the 2004 presidential election, Republican George W. Bush received 61.5% of the vote (759 ballots cast), outpolling Democrat John Kerry with 37.2% (459 votes) and other candidates with 0.2% (3 votes), among the 1,234 ballots cast by the borough's 1,605 registered voters, for a turnout percentage of 76.9.

In the 2013 gubernatorial election, Republican Chris Christie received 75.4% of the vote (600 cast), ahead of Democrat Barbara Buono with 23.0% (183 votes), and other candidates with 1.6% (13 votes), among the 812 ballots cast by the borough's 1,502 registered voters (16 ballots were spoiled), for a turnout of 54.1%. In the 2009 gubernatorial election, Republican Chris Christie received 64.1% of the vote (583 ballots cast), ahead of  Democrat Jon Corzine with 29.6% (269 votes), Independent Chris Daggett with 5.1% (46 votes) and other candidates with 0.4% (4 votes), among the 909 ballots cast by the borough's 1,484 registered voters, yielding a 61.3% turnout.

Education
The Avon School District serves public school students in pre-kindergarten through eighth grade at Avon Elementary School. As of the 2020–21 school year, the district, comprised of one school, had an enrollment of 137 students and 17.7 classroom teachers (on an FTE basis), for a student–teacher ratio of 7.7:1. During the 2016–17 school year, Avon was tied with the 23rd smallest enrollment of any school district in the state, with 158 students.

For ninth through twelfth grades, public school students attend either Asbury Park High School or Manasquan High School, as part of sending/receiving relationships with the respective districts, based on the results of a lottery under which 62.5% of students are sent to Manasquan and 37.5% to Asbury Park. As of the 2020–21 school year, Asbury Park High School had an enrollment of 682 students and 54.5 classroom teachers (on an FTE basis), for a student–teacher ratio of 12.5:1.

The Manasquan school also serves students from Belmar, Brielle, Lake Como, Sea Girt, Spring Lake, Spring Lake Heights who attend as part of sending/receiving relationships with their respective districts. As of the 2020–21 school year, Manasquan High School had an enrollment of 1,006 students and 76.9 classroom teachers (on an FTE basis), for a student–teacher ratio of 13.1:1.

Students may also apply to academy schools in the Monmouth County Vocational School District, which include the Academy of Allied Health & Science, Biotechnology High School, High Technology High School, Marine Academy of Science and Technology and Communications High School. Students also have the option to attend Academy Charter High School in Lake Como, which accepts students on a lottery basis from the communities of Allenhurst, Asbury Park, Avon-by-the-Sea, Belmar, Bradley Beach, Deal, Interlaken and Lake Como.

Transportation

Roads and highways

Route 71 is the main north–south road that passes through. Route 35 is immediately outside the borough, and provides access to Route 138/Interstate 195. The Garden State Parkway is also nearby.

Public transportation
NJ Transit provides bus transportation to Philadelphia on the 317 route and local service on the 830 route. The closest NJ transit train service is at the Belmar station and Bradley Beach station on the North Jersey Coast Line.

Climate

According to the Köppen climate classification system, Avon-by-the-Sea has a humid subtropical climate (Cfa). Cfa climates are characterized by all months having an average temperature > , at least four months with an average temperature ≥ , at least one month with an average temperature ≥  and no significant precipitation difference between seasons. Although most summer days are slightly humid with a cooling afternoon sea breeze in Avon-by-the-Sea, episodes of heat and high humidity can occur with heat index values > . The average wettest month is July which correlates with the peak in thunderstorm activity. Episodes of extreme cold and wind can occur with wind chill values < .

Ecology

According to the A. W. Kuchler U.S. potential natural vegetation types, Avon-by-the-Sea would have a dominant vegetation type of Appalachian Oak (104) with a dominant vegetation form of Eastern Hardwood Forest (25). The average date of first spring leaf-out is March 24 and fall color typically peaks in early-November.

Notable people

People who were born in, residents of, or otherwise closely associated with Avon-by-the-Sea include:

 Leo P. Carlin (1908–1999), Mayor of Newark, New Jersey from 1953 to 1962
 Bronson Howard (1842–1908), dramatist
 Mischa Levitzki (1898–1941), concert pianist
 Bob Scrabis (born 1936), former American football player who played with the New York Titans
 Bob Scrabis, former college basketball player for the Princeton Tigers men's basketball team
 E. Donald Sterner (1894–1983), lumberman and politician who served in both houses of the New Jersey Legislature and as chairman of the New Jersey Republican State Committee

References

External links

 Avon-by-the-Sea official website
 Avon Elementary School
 
 School Data for the Avon Elementary School, National Center for Education Statistics

 
1900 establishments in New Jersey
Boroughs in Monmouth County, New Jersey
Jersey Shore communities in Monmouth County
Populated places established in 1900
Walsh Act